Hot Flash is a Canadian animated short film, directed by Thea Hollatz and released in 2019. The film centres on a woman working as a television newscaster, who experiences a menopause-related hot flash just as she is about to go on air to report on a snowstorm.

The film's voice cast includes Grace Glowicki, Christine Horne, Tyler Johnston, Tony Nappo, Peter Spence and Natty Zavitz.

The film premiered at the 2019 Toronto International Film Festival.

The film won the Canadian Screen Award for Best Animated Short at the 9th Canadian Screen Awards in 2021.

References

External links
 

2019 films
2019 animated films
Canadian animated short films
Best Animated Short Film Genie and Canadian Screen Award winners
2010s animated short films
2010s English-language films
2010s Canadian films